The Men's 5000 metres competition at the 2023 World Single Distances Speed Skating Championships was held on 2 March 2023.

Results
The race was started at 19:35.

References

Men's 5000 metres